The following is a list of Chinese films released in 2018.

Highest-grossing films
These are the top 10 grossing Chinese films that were released in China in 2018:

Films

January – March

April – June

July – September

October – December

References

2018
Films
Chinese